Kalathur is a panchayat village in Peravurani panchayat Union of Thanjavur district in the Indian state of Tamil Nadu.

Kalathur comes under the Peravurani assembly constituency which elects a member to the Tamil Nadu Legislative Assembly once every five years and it is a part of the Thanjavur (Lok Sabha constituency) which elects its member of parliament (MP) once in five years.

Geography
 It is a part of the Pattukottai taluk.
 It is surrounded by Thiruchitrambalam Panchayat in the north, Seruvaviduthi Panchayat in the west and north west, Kalluranikadu to the east, Palayanagaram and Ammayandi Panchayats in the south.

Economy

The village is a part of the fertile Cauvery delta region, and agriculture is the principal occupation of the people of Kalathur.
Cultivated crops include coconut, Paddy, cotton, sugarcane, bananas, cocoa and paddy cultivation is practised extensively.
Cattle rearing is also a major livelihood of kalathur peoples.
Kalathur and its neighbouring villages are known for their coconut plantations.
Coconuts produced there are very pulpy and tasty compared to Pollachi coconut which has more water.
Coconut-based industries can be found here such as coconut oil mills, coir industries etc.

Administration
The Kalathur Panchayat comprises Kalathur East, Kalathur West, Nadangaadu, Pokkanviduthi and Sithukkadu villages and is currently being administered by the Village president, elected once in five years.

Demographics
As of the 2011 Census of India, the village comprises 1576 families residing with a population of 6,424 of which 3190 are males while 3234 are females. The average literacy rate of the village was 79.09%, compared to the national average of 72.99%.

Irrigation
The village is irrigated with the help Kallanai Kaalvaai (The grand anaicut canal).
Lakes are also used extensively for irrigation.
The grand anaicut canal carries the water of river Cauvery to this village.
It is also irrigated by lakes, ponds and tanks.
In the recent years after the arrival of borewells mostly the same is used for irrigation.

Transportation
The state highways SH29 and Major District road 829 pass through Kalathur. There are regular buses to Pattukkottai and Peravurani and mini-buses connecting with Peravurani and Thiruchitrabalam.

Temples
 Sri Muthumariamman Temple
 Sri Balamurugan Temple
 Sri Narayaniamman Temple
 Sri Ayyanar Temple
 Sri Pattavar Temple
 Sri Sannaasi Ayya Temple 
 Sri Agni Kaliamman Temple.

Schools
Government Primary School - Kalathur
Government High School - Kalathur
Government Primary School - Sithukkadu, 
Gover High School - Sithukkadu, 
Kalaivani Nursery and Primary School - Sithukkadu.

References

Thanjavur district